Bab Bnet is one of the gates of the medina of Tunis, the capital of Tunisia. It is the fifth gate pierced in the rampart of the medina between 1228 and 1249.

References

External links

Bnet